Nicht von schlechten Eltern is a German television series.

See also
List of German television series

External links
 

Radio Bremen
1993 German television series debuts
1998 German television series endings
German-language television shows
Das Erste original programming